Rubén del Campo Ferreira (born 22 February 2000) is a Swiss professional footballer who plays as a forward for Spanish club San Fernando.

Club career
On 17 January 2020, del Campo signed a contract with Famalicão. Del Campo made his professional debut with Famalicão in a Primeira Liga match with Benfica on 9 July 2020.

On 23 August 2021, he joined Spanish fourth-tier club Melilla on loan.

International career
Del Campo was born in Switzerland, and is of Spanish descent through his father. He is a former youth international for Switzerland.

References

External links
 
 
 SFV U16 Profile
 SFV U17 Profile
 SFV U18 Profile
 SFV U19 Profile
 SFV U20 Profile

2000 births
Living people
People from Fribourg
Swiss men's footballers
Switzerland youth international footballers
Swiss people of Spanish descent
Association football forwards
Atlético Madrid B players
F.C. Famalicão players
CD Numancia players
UD Melilla footballers
Primeira Liga players
Segunda División B players
Segunda Federación players
Swiss expatriate footballers
Swiss expatriates in the Netherlands
Swiss expatriate sportspeople in Spain
Expatriate footballers in Portugal
Expatriate footballers in the Netherlands
Expatriate footballers in Spain
Sportspeople from the canton of Fribourg
Swiss expatriate sportspeople in Portugal